JDub Records was a non-profit record and event production company that produced Jewish music and cross cultural musical dialogue. JDub, unlike most record labels, derived half its annual income from foundations and individual donors and the other half from record and ticket sales. As a non-profit Jewish organization its stated mission was to "forge vibrant connections to Judaism through music, media and cultural events." JDub operations included an artists' fellowship program, overseeing the Jewcy website, event production and consulting.

Along with the Foundation for Jewish Culture and Avoda Arts, JDub launched The Six Points Fellowship for Emerging Jewish Artists, an artist development program financed by $1 million from the Commission on Jewish Identity and Renewal of UJA-Federation. The grant, described as the largest ever by UJA to an arts organization, gave each of 12 New York-based artists up to $45,000 for living expenses and project-related support for two years.

As of 2012, JDub's recording catalogue is owned by The Orchard, a division of Sony Music.

History
Founded in December 2002 by two NYU students, Ben Hesse and Aaron Bisman. In its start-up phase, JDub focused on developing a small cadre of artists, including Matisyahu, Socalled, and Balkan Beat Box. In October 2009, JDub adopted Jewcy, an online magazine and blog. JDub COO Jacob Harris led the acquisition and served as publisher of Jewcy.

On July 1, 2004, JDub produced "The Unity Sessions" at Celebrate Brooklyn in Prospect Park, Brooklyn. The event brought Israeli, Palestinian, Jewish, and American Muslim performers including Matisyahu, Sagol 59, TN (Tamer Nafar), and Mooke.

On October 28, 2004, JDub released Matisyahu's debut album, Shake Off the Dust... Arise.

In December 2009, JDub announced a strategic partnership with Nextbook which publishes books in collaboration with Random House's Shocken imprint, and produces Tablet Magazine. According to the JTA: "Under the partnership, the two organizations will remain separate and will still produce their own records and books and cultural materials, but JDub will essentially become Nextbook’s in-house marketing and PR department."

In July 2011 JDub announced it would close due to an inability to find new funding and the collapse of the music industry in general.

Artists
Balkan Beat Box
Can Can
Axum
Golem
The LeeVees
Soulico
Matisyahu (2003-2006, Management; 2003-2005, Label)
Michael Showalter (comedian)
Girls in Trouble
The Macaroons
Socalled
Sagol 59
DeLeon
Tomer Yosef (lead MC of Balkan Beat Box)
The Sway Machinery
The Wailing Wall
Steve "The Gangsta Rabbi" Lieberman

See also
 List of record labels

References

Former Artists
Matisyahu

External links
JDub Records

American independent record labels
Jewish rock
Record labels established in 2002
Record labels disestablished in 2011